Regino Pedroso (April 5, 1896 – December 7, 1983) was a Cuban poet.

He won the National Poetry Prize of Cuba in 1939 for his book Beyond the sea sings. That same year published his poetic Anthology (1918-1938).

Works
We (Nosotros). Poems. Havana, Editorial Tropics, 1933.
Poetic Anthology (Antología poética) (1918-1938). Havana, Imp Molina, 1939.
Beyond the sea sings (Más allá canta el mar). Poem. Havana Imp Veronica, 1939.
Bolivar Symphony freedom (Bolívar, sinfonía de libertad). Poem. Havana, P. Fernández, 1945.
The Yuan Pei Fu plum (El ciruelo de Yuan Pei Fu). Chinese poems. Havana, P. Fernandez, 1955.
Poems (Poemas). Prol. Nicolás Guillén. Anthology. Havana, Eds. Union, 1966.
Poetry (Obra poética). "Regino Pedroso and the new Cuban poetry" by Felix Pita Rodriguez. Havana, Editorial Art and Literature, 1975.

20th-century Cuban poets
Cuban male poets
1896 births
1983 deaths
20th-century male writers